Kang Ling (凌康 born 14 March 1997) is a Chinese racing driver.

Career

Karting
Ling began karting in 2010 and raced in Asia for the majority of his career, winning 2012 Asian Karting Championship x30 Senior class. Other highlights in his karting career include; a 4th-place finish in the 2010 KF3 Asia-Pacific Championship  and 28th position in 2012 KF1 CIK-FIA World Karting Championship, scoring 6 points. He ended his karting career in 2012 and moved into single-seaters in 2013.

French F4 Championship
Ling made the step up into single-seaters in 2013, participating in the 2013 French F4 Championship, he scored 4 points, all of which came at the third round in Spa.

Formula Renault 2.0 Alps
In 2014, Ling signed for the Koiranen GP team to race in the 2014 Formula Renault 2.0 Alps championship, but left mid-season after scoring no points.

GP3 Series
Ling joined the Trident team in the GP3 Series for the final round of the season in the 2014 in Abu Dhabi. He replaced Luca Ghiotto in car number 23, and became the eleventh driver to race for the team that season.

FIA European Formula 3 Championship
In 2015, Ling will graduate to the FIA European Formula 3 Championship, joining Mücke Motorsport.

Euroformula Open Championship
After been dropped halfway through the 2015 FIA Formula 3 European Championship for poor results, his seat was taken by Félix Serrallés.

Making guest appearances, Ling joined DAV Racing for the final two rounds of the Euroformula Open championship at Monza and the Circuit de Barcelona-Catalunya, achieving a best result of twelfth position. As a guest driver Ling was unable to score points.

Racing record

Career summary

† As Ling was a guest driver, he was ineligible for points.

Complete GP3 Series results
(key) (Races in bold indicate pole position) (Races in italics indicate fastest lap)

Complete FIA European Formula 3 Championship results
(key) (Races in bold indicate pole position) (Races in italics indicate fastest lap)

References

1997 births
Living people
Chinese racing drivers
Sportspeople from Jiangsu
British Formula Three Championship drivers
GP3 Series drivers
FIA Formula 3 European Championship drivers
International GT Open drivers
F3 Asian Championship drivers
French F4 Championship drivers
Formula Renault 2.0 Alps drivers
German Formula Three Championship drivers
Euroformula Open Championship drivers
Blancpain Endurance Series drivers
Asian Le Mans Series drivers
Auto Sport Academy drivers
Koiranen GP drivers
Trident Racing drivers
Mücke Motorsport drivers
Ombra Racing drivers
Euronova Racing drivers
Karting World Championship drivers
21st-century Chinese people
Chinese F4 Championship drivers
BlackArts Racing drivers